Major General The Hon.Seymour Hector Russell Hale Monro  (born 7 May 1950) is a former officer in the British Army and current Lord Lieutenant of Moray.

Earliest life and education
Monro is the eldest son of Hector Monro, Baron Monro of Langholm, and was born in Edinburgh, Scotland on 7 May 1950. He was educated at Cargilfield Preparatory School and Glenalmond College, both private schools in Scotland.

Career

Military service
He was commissioned into the Queen's Own Highlanders in 1970 from RMA Sandhurst and was awarded the Sword of Honour. He commanded the 1st Battalion  Queens Own Highlanders in Belfast and in the First Gulf War. Subsequently, he commanded the 39 Infantry Brigade in Belfast and later was the United Kingdom's Director of Infantry. His last military appointment was as Deputy Commander of the NATO Rapid Deployable Corps, in Italy.

Business career
Monro later became Executive Director of the Atlantic Salmon Trust and Adjutant of The Queen's Body Guard for Scotland and later Chairman of the Highlanders’ Museum at Fort George where he was responsible for its £2.75 million upgrade project. He has also been Chairman of the Prince's Trust in the Highlands and of the Findhorn, Nairn and Lossie Fisheries’ trust. He served on the board of Cairngorm Mountain Ltd.

He was instrumental in establishing The Highland Military Tattoo at Fort George in 2014 and was its Executive Chairman and Tattoo Director until it ceased in 2017. He was also Honorary Air Commodore of 2622 (Highland) Squadron The Royal Auxiliary Air Force at RAF Lossiemouth from 2008 to 2019.

He is currently Chairman of the Northern Meeting Piping Trust. He is also Honorary President of Forres and District Pipe Band, of the Forres Branch of the Royal British Legion Scotland, of Forres in Bloom and of the Brisbane Observatory Trust in Largs. He is also Chairman (Designate) of the Leanchoil Trust which will turn the former cottage hospital in Forres into a Veterans’ Activity Centre and a local community health and wellbeing hub.

Honours
Monro is appointed as Her Majesty The Queen's Lord-Lieutenant for Moray to succeed Lieutenant Colonel Grenville Johnston CVO OBE TD, who retired on 28 January 2020.

He was appointed a Commander of the Order of the British Empire (CBE) in 1996, and was appointed Lieutenant of the Royal Victorian Order (LVO) in 2010.

References 

1950 births
Living people
People educated at Cargilfield School
People educated at Glenalmond College
Lord-Lieutenants of Moray
Queen's Own Highlanders officers
Commanders of the Order of the British Empire
Lieutenants of the Royal Victorian Order
Sons of life peers
British Army generals
British Army personnel of the Gulf War
Graduates of the Royal Military Academy Sandhurst
Military personnel from Edinburgh
Members of the Royal Company of Archers